Fyodor Vasilievich Kudryashov (born 5 April 1987) is a Russian professional footballer who plays for Turkish club Antalyaspor and the Russia national team as a left back. He can also play as a centre back.

Club career
Born  in Irkutsk Oblast, Kudryashov came in from FC Sibiryak, Bratsk. In 2004 while playing for the Siberia selection, he was noticed by Sergey Shavlo, who was Spartak Moscow scout at that time. After playing for Spartak reserves, he had his debut during the last match of the 2006 season. In the new season Kudryashov unexpectedly became a first team regular after Clemente Rodríguez was loaned out.

In 2008, Kudryashov played for FC Khimki on loan from July to December. In August 2010, he was loaned to FC Tom Tomsk. He was also loaned to FC Krasnodar from FC Spartak Moscow.

On 1 February 2012, he missed a penalty in a penalty shootout against the Norwegian team Rosenborg BK, the penalty shootout ended 10-9 with FC Spartak Moscow losing. This was their second match in the friendly Cup del Sol tournament.

On 10 January 2019, he was released from his contract with FC Rubin Kazan.

On 31 January 2019, he signed a 1.5-year contract with the Turkish club İstanbul Başakşehir. He left the club on 20 June 2019.

On 12 July 2019, he signed with PFC Sochi. On 18 December 2019, his contract with Sochi was dissolved by mutual consent.

On 6 January 2020, he signed a 1.5-year contract with the Turkish club Antalyaspor.

On 22 July 2021, he extended his contract for the Turkish club.

International career
He was called up to the senior Russia squad in August 2016 for matches against Turkey and Ghana. He made his debut against Turkey on 31 August 2016.

On 11 May 2018, he was included in Russia's extended 2018 FIFA World Cup squad. On 3 June 2018, he was included in the finalized World Cup squad. After coming on as a substitute in the second group game against Egypt, he started in Russia's last three games at the tournament - the last group game against Uruguay, the round of 16 defeat of Spain and the quarterfinal shoot-out loss to Croatia.

On 11 May 2021, he was included in the preliminary extended 30-man squad for UEFA Euro 2020. On 2 June 2021, he was included in the final squad. He missed Russia's first two group stage games due to injury before starting on 21 June in the last group game against Denmark as Russia lost 1–4 and was eliminated, with Kudryashov substituted halfway through the second half.

Career statistics

Club

International

International goals
 (Russia score listed first, score column indicates score after each Kudryashov goal)

References

External links
Gazeta.ru profile 

1987 births
Living people
2017 FIFA Confederations Cup players
2018 FIFA World Cup players
Antalyaspor footballers
Association football fullbacks
Expatriate footballers in Turkey
FC Akhmat Grozny players
FC Khimki players
FC Krasnodar players
FC Rostov players
FC Rubin Kazan players
FC Spartak Moscow players
FC Tom Tomsk players
İstanbul Başakşehir F.K. players
People from Irkutsk Oblast
PFC Sochi players
Russia international footballers
Russia under-21 international footballers
Russian expatriate footballers
Russian footballers
Russian Premier League players
UEFA Euro 2020 players
Sportspeople from Irkutsk Oblast